Max is a children's book by Bob Graham. In 2000 it won the Nestlé Smarties Book Prize Gold Award.

Plot summary
Baby Max is the son of legendary superheroes Captain Lightning and Madam Thunderbolt. Though he quickly learns to walk and talk, his parents worry because he is slow learning to fly.

References

2000 children's  books
Australian picture books
Superhero fiction
Australian children's books